Henry Duncker (born 4 March 1885, date of death unknown) was a Jamaican cricketer. He played in four first-class matches for the Jamaican cricket team from 1905 to 1911.

See also
 List of Jamaican representative cricketers

References

External links
 

1885 births
Year of death missing
Jamaican cricketers
Jamaica cricketers
Sportspeople from Kingston, Jamaica